Sayyid Abd al-Saleh Abd al-Husayn al-Killdar Tumah (1911–October 30, 2005) was an Iraqi nobleman that served as the 38th custodian of the Imam Husayn shrine from 1931 until 1981.

Biography 
al-Killidar was born in 1911 to Abdul Husayn al-Killidar. He is from the Tumah branch of the Al Faiz family. His mother is the daughter of renowned merchant, Abd al-Hadi al-Astarabadi. His maternal uncle, Mahmoud al-Astarabadi, was a member of the senate in the royal era for the city of Kadhimiya.

He took responsibility of the sidana in 1928, was officially assigned in 1931.

al-Killidar helped rebuild his fathers library, after it was burnt in the Hamza Bey incident of 1915.

In 1966, al-Killidar renewed the clock of the shrine, that was gifted by Naser al-Din Shah in 1891. al-Killidar imported the clock from Germany, and it remained in the shrine until the 1991 uprising, where it was destroyed during one of the Baathist helicopter gunship attacks.

al-Killidar retired on June 7, 1981, after serving for just under 50 years, and passed down the custodianship to his son, Adel.

Personal life 
al-Killidar was married to his second cousin, Iftikhar al-Astarabadi. She was the daughter of Khalil al-Astarabadi (1877–1970), the last mayor of Karbala under the Hashemite monarchy. He had three sons, Ali (d. 2018; dean of engineering at University of Baghdad), Adel (who became the  after him) and Abdelilah and two daughters Afaf and Awatif. al-Killidar was fluent in English and Persian.

Death 
al-Killidar died on Sunday October 30, 2005, in his home in London. His body was transferred to Karbala to be buried.

See also 

 Imam Husayn shrine
 Al Faiz family

References 

People from Karbala
1911 births
2005 deaths
Custodian of the Imam Husayn Shrine
20th-century Iraqi people